Janis Rafailidou (also known as Janis Rafa), born in Greece 1988, is an artist engaging with sculpture, video art and film. She was recently featured in the 59th International Art Exhibition La Biennale di Venezia with her 2020 short film Lacerate, and her work has been acquired by various institutions, such as Centraal Museum, Stedelijk Museum, and Fondazione in Between Art Film.

Life and work 
In 2012 Rafailidou obtained a PhD in Fine Art at the University of Leeds. Between 2013 and 2014, she was a resident at the Rijksakademie and in 2020 she was awarded a fellowship at ARTWORKS by S. Niarchos Foundation. It was during her residency at the Dutch Rijksakademie that she begun shifting her focus from video art to film. She is now living and working between Athens and Amsterdam.

Selected works

2006 
 Adam, Eve and the Child (short)

2009 
 2755 Miles (short)
 Taxing in the City (short)

2010 
 Dad Where Are You?
 I Thought I Found You But I Was Looking on Footage of a Different Country
 I Thought I Found You, Dad Where Are You?

2012 
 Exit K1
The title of this film refers to a road exit in the outskirts of Athens (GR), "Exit K1", that leads away from the city, onto a dirt road. There, clandestine migrants travel "invisibly", avoiding the immediate metropolitan area. The work explores the reality of Greek periphery through the citizens' perspective.

2013 
 Three Farewells
This piece consists of three videos shot in 4K, 2.40:1 with stereo sound, namely: Father Gravedigger (20’); Our Dead Dogs (17’); The Last Burial (25’). The trilogy evades anthropocentric conceptions of death, mourning and melancholia, framing them in a post-human narrative. Each video narrates a burial, exploring the common vulnerability and shared pain between humans and non-humans. The work exemplifies Rafalidou's cinematic narrative as characterised by a realism suspended between personal impression and actuality. 
 Our Dead Dogs
 Father Gravedigger
 The Last Burial
 8 Kilos of Garden

2014 
 Requiem to a Shipwreck
 A Sign of Prosperity to the Dreamer
 Gravediggers

2015 
 Configuration of the Man Who Has Seen Without Being Seen
 Requiem to a Fatal Incident
 Winter Came Early

2016 
 Untitled
 There She Blows
 The Thin Crust of Earth
 Covers

2018 
 Take 11: What Remains Is a Wound Disembodied
 Covers, Footplates#1–2
 Another 10kg of Garden

2019 
 Take 11 (installation)
 Verism#1–5
 In the Flat Field #5818
 Verism#2–5
 Another 10kg of Garden, and Another 15 kg of Garden (We Know This is A.)

2020 
 Kala Azar
The protagonists of Kala Azar are a couple that works in an animal crematorium and illegally cremate roadkill animals. The film is set in a surrealist universe created by Rafalidou and filled with landscapes, animals, living and dead bodies. Kala Azar has participated in thirty-eight film festivals, among which the 49th International Film Festival Rotterdam and the Hong Kong International Film Festival (2020), receiving a total of nine awards.
 Lacerate

2021 
 Waiting for Time to Pass
 I Am the Daughter of a Sheep

Selected exhibitions

2015 

 Palazzo Strozzi

2016 

 Janis Rafa and The Fear of Leaving the Animal Forever Forgotten Under the Ground, EYE Filmmuseum (Amsterdam, NL), from 2016 to 2021.

2017 

 Kunsthalle Munster
 Centre d'Art Contemporaine Chanot
 Palazzo Medici Riccardi

2018 

 Mardin Biennial
 Manifesta 12

2019 

 [solo-exhibition] Eaten by Non-Humans, Centraal Museum (Utrecht, NL), from 2019 to 2020.

2020 
MAXXI
State of Concept Athens

2021 
Bucharest Biennial
Goethe-Institut (GR, 2021)

2022 
The Milk of Dreams, Venice Biennale

References 

Video artists
Greek artists
1988 births
Living people